The Tanque Argentino Mediano (TAM; English: Argentine Medium Tank) is a medium tank in service with the Argentine Army.  Lacking the experience and resources to design a tank, the Argentine Ministry of Defense contracted German company Thyssen-Henschel. The vehicle was developed by a German and Argentine team of engineers, and was based on the German Marder infantry fighting vehicle chassis.

The TAM met the Argentine Army's requirement for a modern, lightweight and fast tank with a low silhouette and sufficient firepower to defeat contemporary armored threats. Development began in 1974 and resulted in the construction of three prototypes by early 1977 and full-scale production by 1979. Assembly took place at the local  TAMSE plant, founded for the purpose by the Argentine government. Economic difficulties halted production in 1983, but manufacturing began anew in 1994 until the army's order of 200 tanks was fulfilled.

The TAM series includes seven different variants, such as a  self-propelled howitzer and a self-propelled mortar vehicle. In total, over 280 such vehicles were built, including armored personnel carriers, artillery and mortar pieces. The TAM and VCTP (Infantry Fighting Vehicles based on the TAM chassis) were manufactured for the Peruvian Army, only to be integrated into the Argentine Army when Peru canceled the contract. The TAM also competed for other export orders, but the TAM was ultimately not exported.

The TAM has never seen combat, although 17 VCTPs were deployed to Croatia for the United Nations UNPROFOR peacekeeping mission.

Development

During the 1960s Argentina sought to replace its aging fleet of tanks, which included British Sherman V Firefly tanks and American M3A1 half-tracks dating from shortly after the Second World War.  In their attempts to procure equipment from the United States, Argentina could only secure 50 M41 Walker Bulldogs (undelivered) and 250 M113 armored personnel carriers.  When the United States turned down requests for further equipment, the Argentine government turned to the other side of the Atlantic, putting their "Plan Europa" (Plan Europe) into action.  It was hoped that European technology could stimulate Argentine industry so the country could produce its own armaments in the future.  Argentina procured 80 AMX-13 light tanks, as well as 180 AMX-VCIs and 24 AMX-155 F3s, from the French government, manufacturing around 40 AMX-13s and 60 AMX-VCIs at home.  The French AMX-30 and German Leopard 1 were also examined as possible replacements for the Argentine Sherman fleet.

In 1973 the Argentine Ministry of Defense drew up a series of requirements for a tank to enter service in the 1980s. It would be armed with a modern 105 mm main gun, two machine guns, and grenade launchers. The tank designers also had to take into account Argentina's existing infrastructure, including railroad capacity, bridges and road capacity, as well as the country's varied terrain. In late 1973 the Proyecto de Tanque Argentino Mediano (Argentine Medium Tank Project) was founded with the goal of designing and developing a tank for the Argentine Army. Lacking the experience and the necessary technology, the Argentine government sought collaboration with a foreign company, resulting in a contract with the German company Thyssen-Henschel. The contract called for a transfer of technology resulting in a program to develop a tank in line with the government's requirements and under a technical team that included both German and Argentine engineers. The hull of the German Marder armored personnel carrier was used, and the chassis was strengthened to support the increased weight of the TAM. Simultaneously, another prototype was manufactured to further the investigation of the new vehicle and complete the three prototypes as agreed in the contract.

The new tank's firepower requirements were met by fitting a British  Royal Ordnance L7A1  main gun. This gun was later replaced by the modified L7A2 and finally by Rheinmetall's Rh-105-30  gun. This gun is manufactured in Argentina as the FM K.4 Modelo 1L. The Rh-105-30's advantages include low weight, compact size and increased lethality. Unlike the Rh-105-30, the FM K.4 does not have a muzzle brake. The locally built cannon can be elevated to 18 degrees or depressed to -7 degrees on the TAM. It can also fire high-explosive anti-tank rounds, high-explosive squash head and smoke rounds. The tank's secondary armaments include a co-axial  FN MAG 60-40 general purpose machine gun and a second FN MAG 60-20 mounted on the TAM's turret roof as an anti-aircraft machine gun. The tank commander uses a Zeiss PERI-R/TA panoramic periscope, with a 2x and 8x zoom.

The TAM's engine requirements included low weight and volume, but with a fast rate of acceleration and high reliability. The program chose MTU's MB-833 Ka 500 diesel engine, producing  at 2,400 rpm. With a  internal fuel tank, the TAM can travel . Its range is extended to  if the vehicle is equipped with two  external fuel tanks. The TAM's transmission is a Renk HSWL-204 automatic, with a hydrodynamic torque converter. A double brake system includes hydraulic disk brakes on the roadwheels, and the suspension is a torsion bar.

The TAM's survivability is related to its low profile turret, based on that of the Leopard 1A4s and the Leopard 2, and its physical armor array. It has  at 75 degrees on the glacis plate and 32 degrees on the vehicle's sides. This offers protection against anti-armor shells from up to  guns. Although the tank's weight and armor protection are light compared to other main battle tanks, it has the advantage of better tactical mobility over the nation's terrain.

As a private venture, Thyssen-Henschel built a fourth prototype designated TH 301. Completed in 1978, it added a PERI R12 periscope, originally designed for the Leopard 1A4, for the tank commander.  The gunner and loader each received a day periscope as well. To enable the crew to fire effectively at night, a low light level television (LLLTV) camera, which moved in elevation with the main gun, was fitted to the mantlet.  Furthermore, the tank received a more powerful  engine.  The improvement program also made provisions to increase the thickness of the armor for additional protection.

Production

Production began in 1979, with the intent to build a total of 512 armored vehicles (200 tanks and 312 VCTP infantry fighting vehicles). Economic problems, however, ended production in 1983 with only 150 TAMs and 100 VCTPs built. These vehicles were produced by an Argentine company, Tanque Argentino Mediano Sociedad del Estado (or TAMSE) founded by the government in March 1980.  70% of the TAM's components were manufactured in Argentina, while the 30% manufactured in Germany corresponded to the transmission, optics and fire control system.  In 1983, 20 TAMs and 26 VCTPs were delivered to the Argentine Army after an original order of 80 TAMs by Peru was canceled due to budgetary issues.  In 1991, TAMSE and the TAM production line were shut down, although in 1994 TAMSE was reactivated to complete an order for 120 of both TAMs and VCTPs to replace the M4 Shermans in the 2nd Armored Cavalry Brigade of the Argentine Army.  By 1995 the Argentine Army was equipped with 200 TAM tanks and 216 VCTP and VCPC armored vehicles.  Although 25 VCA-155s were originally planned for production starting in 1990, only 19 were completed and delivered by 1995, along with 50 VCTMs.  No other variants of the TAM, including the VCLC, VAC and VCRT  were put into production due to budget restrictions.

The TAMSE plant is a  facility.  The factory is completely covered, with two warehouses for storing components, quality control laboratories, a project office, an engine test room and a firing range.  Also participating in the production of TAM and variant components were Argentine companies Military Factories General San Martín (manufacturing the chassis), Río Tercero (turret and armament) and Bator Cocchis, S.A.

Export and combat history 

The TAM has never been exported, although a number of nations were interested in buying it. In 1981, Malaysia signed a contract for 102 vehicles of the TAM family, including the tank, VCTP and VCRT (renaming these Lion, Tiger and Elephant, respectively). None of these vehicles were delivered and Malaysia chose instead to procure Poland's PT-91.  In mid-1983, Peru established a contract for 80 TAMs. Due to budgetary problems the order was canceled after 20 tanks had been completed. A similar order was established by Panama in 1984, and was canceled as well.  In 1989 the TAM competed in a tank procurement order from Ecuador, alongside the American Stingray light tank, the Austrian SK-105 Kürassier and the French AMX-13-105 light tank. The TAM achieved 950 out of 1,000 points, while its closest competitor earned 750 points, but in the end Ecuador did not procure any of the vehicles presented.

In the Middle East, both Iran and Saudi Arabia expressed interest in the TAM. The Iranian deal fell through after Saudi Arabia and Iraq successfully appealed to Germany to cancel the order.  TAMSE attempted to sell 60 tanks through a Panamanian company, Agrometal, offering this company a commission worth 10% of the contract's price. This failed when TAMSE lowered the price of the vehicles, angering the Iranian government, which subsequently canceled the offer.
The Saudi Arabian deal was scrapped when Israel appealed to Germany to cancel the order.  Failing to export the tank, the Argentine government closed the TAMSE fabrication plant in 1995.

The TAM did not participate in the Falklands War, as it had not entered service before the end of the conflict.

Seventeen VCTPs were deployed with an Argentine battalion to Yugoslavia during United Nations peacekeeping operations.

Variants

A number of variants were built on the same chassis as the TAM tank. The original program called for the design of an infantry fighting vehicle, and in 1977 the program finished manufacturing the prototype of the Vehículo de Combate Transporte de Personal (Personnel Transport Combat Vehicle), or VCTP.  The VCTP is able to transport a squad of 12 men, including the squad leader and nine riflemen. The squad leader is situated in the turret of the vehicle; one rifleman sits behind him and another six are seated in the chassis, the eighth manning the hull machine gun and the ninth situated in the turret with the gunner. All personnel can fire their weapons from inside the vehicle, and the VCTP's turret is armed with Rheinmetall's Rh-202  autocannon. The VCTP holds 880 rounds for the autocannon, including subcaliber armor-piercing DM63 rounds.  It is also armed with a 7.62 mm FN MAG 60-20 machine gun mounted on the turret roof. Infantry can dismount through a door on the rear of the hull.  The commander has a day sight and seven observation periscopes, while the gunner has a day sight and three observation periscopes.

Variants also include the Vehículo de Combate de Artillería de 155 mm (155 mm Artillery Combat Vehicle), or VCA 155, and the Vehículo de Combate Transporte de Mortero (Mortar Transport Combat Vehicle), or VCTM. The VCA-155 is an elongated TAM chassis fitted with Oto Melara's Palmaria  self-propelled howitzer turret. It carries 28 projectiles, 23 of which are stored in the turret bustle. Based on the TAM chassis, the Vehículo de Combate Puesto de Mando (command combat vehicle), or VCPC, is another variant designed in 1982. The Vehículo de Combate Lanzacohetes (Rocket launcher combat vehicle), or VCLC, designed in 1986, is also based on the TAM chassis and can be fitted with both  and  rockets. A combat ambulance, Vehículo de Combate Ambulancia (VCA), and an armored recovery vehicle, Vehículo de Combate de Recuperación (VCRT) are other combat variants of the tank.

TAM 2C 

In 2010, a modernization program was announced. Israeli defense contractor Elbit Systems was chosen to provide 3-axis gyro-stabilization. The first TAM unit upgraded by Elbit Systems was delivered in March 2013. The TAM 2C was upgraded with many features, mainly revolving around electronics and other secondary features. The upgrades included a thermal imager for the gunner and commander, a thermal sleeve for the barrel, and an auxiliary power unit to provide power to critical systems when the main engine is off and reduce fuel consumption while idling. The TAM 2C also had numerous firepower upgrades, including new APFSDS shells and a new HEAT shell, and the capability to fire LAHAT anti-tank guided missiles, with over 800 mm of penetration and 8 km range. It is not known whether or not the Argentinian government will purchase such missiles. The TAM 2C also received a new turret storage basket.

Users

 
 Argentine Army

Notes

References

Further reading 
 
 

Vehicles introduced in 1983
Medium tanks of the Cold War
Main battle tanks of Argentina
Main battle tanks of the Cold War
Post–Cold War main battle tanks
Argentina–Germany relations
Military vehicles introduced in the 1980s